Telegeusis is a genus of beetles in the family Omethidae, formerly considered to belong in a separate family "Telegeusidae".

Species
 Telegeusis austellus Zaragoza-Caballero & Rodriguez-Velez, 2011
 Telegeusis boreios Zaragoza-Caballero & Rodriguez-Velez, 2011
 Telegeusis chamelensis Zaragoza-Caballero, 1975
 Telegeusis debilis Horn, 1895
 Telegeusis glessum Zaragoza-Caballero & Rodriguez-Velez, 2011
 Telegeusis granulatus Zaragoza-Caballero & Rodriguez-Velez, 2011
 Telegeusis nubifer Martin, 1932
 Telegeusis orientalis Zaragoza-Caballero, 1990
 Telegeusis panamaensis Allen & Hutton, 1969
 Telegeusis schwarzi Barber, 1952
 Telegeusis sonorensis Zaragoza-Caballero & Rodriguez-Velez, 2011
 Telegeusis texensis Fleenor & Taber, 2001 (Texas long-lipped beetle)

References

 Miller, Richard S. / Arnett, Ross H. Jr., Michael C. Thomas, Paul E. Skelley, and J. H. Frank, eds. (2002). "Family 60. Telegeusidae Leng 1920". American Beetles, vol. 2: Polyphaga through Curculionoidea, 179–180.

Further reading

 NCBI Taxonomy Browser, Telegeusis
 Arnett, R.H. Jr., M. C. Thomas, P. E. Skelley and J. H. Frank. (eds.). (2002). American Beetles, Volume II: Polyphaga: Scarabaeoidea through Curculionoidea. CRC Press LLC, Boca Raton, FL.
 
 Richard E. White. (1983). Peterson Field Guides: Beetles. Houghton Mifflin Company.

Elateroidea